José Antonio Pérez Sánchez (20 December 1947 – 8 July 2020) was a Mexican Roman Catholic bishop.

Pérez Sanchéz was born in Mexico and was ordained to the priesthood in 1976. He served as coadjutor bishop of the Territorial Prelature of Jesús María del Nayar from 1992 to 1994 and as bishop of the territorial prelature from 1994 to 2010.

Notes

1947 births
2020 deaths
21st-century Roman Catholic bishops in Mexico
20th-century Roman Catholic bishops in Mexico